Kantou may refer to:

Kantō region, an area of Japan
Kantou, Cyprus, a town in Cyprus
Kantou (plant), a genus of plants, now treated as a synonym of Inhambanella